Willie Williams may refer to:

Music
 Willie Williams (jazz, born 1958), American saxophone player

Sports

American football
 Willie Williams (cornerback, born 1941), American NFL football player for the New York Giants and Oakland Raiders
 Willie Williams (offensive tackle) (born 1967), American NFL football player the Phoenix Cardinals and New Orleans Saints
 Willie Williams (cornerback, born 1970), American NFL football player for the Pittsburgh Steelers and Seattle Seahawks
 Willie Williams (defensive tackle) (born 1984), American NFL football player for the St. Louis Rams and Philadelphia Eagles

Other sports
 Willie Williams (baseball) (1925–2011), American baseball player
 Willie Williams (athlete) (1931–2019), American sprinter
 Willie Williams (cricketer) (born 1941), English cricketer
 Willie Williams (basketball) (born 1946), American basketball player
 Willie Williams (karateka) (1951–2019), American karateka and mixed martial artist

Others
 James E. Williams (Willie Williams, 1930–1999), United States Navy sailor awarded the Medal of Honor
 Willie L. Williams (1943–2016), American police officer, Los Angeles police chief
 Willie Williams (general) (born 1951), American Marine Corps general
 Willie Williams (murderer) (1956–2005), American murderer
 Willie Williams (set designer) (born 1959), British theatrical stage set, lighting designer and video director
 Willi Williams, Jamaican reggae and dub singer

See also
 William Williams (disambiguation)